Jaime Black is of Anishinaabe and Finnish descent. This Canadian multidisciplinary artist-activist is focused on First Nations and Indigenous representation and identity. She identifies as Métis, an ethnic group native to the three Prairie Provinces (Manitoba, Saskatchewan, Alberta) as well as parts of Ontario, British Columbia, and the Northwest Territories of Canada and the Northern United States, which traces descent to both Indigenous North Americans and Western European settlers. Black is best known for her art installation The REDress Project that she created as a response to the Missing and Murdered Indigenous Women (MMIW) crisis in Canada as well as the United States. A 2014 report by the Royal Canadian Mounted Police found that more than 1,000 Indigenous women were murdered over the span of 30 years from 1980 to 2012. However, some Indigenous advocacy groups dispute these reports arguing that the number is much greater than the government has acknowledged.

Black centers her creative practice on Indigenous womanhood and the effects of Colonization on Indigenous peoples in North America. Black's art has brought attention to the continued violence against Indigenous women. Her artwork has been featured in many museums across North America and has received recognition from the Canadian government, with a holiday celebrating her work on The REDress project called Red Dress Day.

Early life 
Jaime Black was born in Thunder Bay, Ontario, and later moved to Regina, Saskatchewan. At age 12, Black's family moved to Winnipeg, Canada where she continues to live today. In an interview recorded in 2019, Black describes how “there are very high rates of violence and racism in those communities.” According to Black, she was unaware of the problems due to a lack of discussion about these topics in her early education. As an adult, Black studied English literature at the University of Manitoba, earning a Bachelor of Arts in Literature and Native Studies in 2004. Black then earned an education degree from the Ontario Institute for Studies in Education at the University of Toronto in 2008. Following her studies, Black taught at the Opaskwayak Cree Nation in The Pas, Manitoba, and developed an art curriculum for the Urban Shaman, an aboriginal artist-run center in Winnipeg.

Career 
As an educator, Black developed art curricula for schools while involving herself in local writing groups near her home. Black is also associated with the Mentoring Artists for Women's Art group as a mentor. She continues to work in various capacities for groups that focus on education and Indigenous rights.

Black is widely known for her 2010 creation of the REDress Project, an art installation of empty red dresses hung in public spaces, meant to bring awareness to Missing and Murdered Indigenous Women (MMIW). Hanging red dresses conveys the violence experienced by women of Indigenous communities. The Canadian Government's National Inquiry into Missing and Murdered Indigenous Women and Girls states that despite Indigenous women only making up 4% of the population of Canada, they make up 16% of all homicides. Black's REDress Project acts as a direct response to these extreme rates of violence. To create a REDress showing, Black collects donated red dresses from local communities which she then later displays in public spaces.

Themes 
Black's art grapples with the effects of European colonization on Indigenous peoples in North America. She highlights the themes of death and absence as a result of ongoing colonization as well as its consequences on Indigenous understandings of identity, spirituality, and sovereignty. Additionally, Black's art has a strong political focus making Indigenous peoples not only seen as victims but as presently thriving Indigenous communities.

In 2019, during a talk at the Safety for Our Sisters: Ending Violence Against Native Women Symposium in Washington D.C, Black commented that when people view Indigenous women in red dresses, she wants them to understand that “we are wearing these dresses, and our power is still real. We are going to reclaim it.”

In recent projects, Black places her art within the context of land and water. Black explains this new focus as both a personal desire to reconnect with nature and a larger environmental commentary on the ongoing struggles of Indigenous peoples to resist corporate and governmental pollution of the lands and resources they use to survive.

Influences 
Black's artwork and motivation have been influenced by other Indigenous women. Black cites a presentation by Jo-Ann Episkenew at a conference in Germany as an early influence on her focus on missing and murdered Indigenous women in Canada.

In 2009, Black witnessed a performance in Bogota, Colombia where 300 women whose family members were murdered or had gone missing gathered in the public square to draw attention to the problem. During this performance, 40 women in red dresses performed a choreographed dance while shouting the names of their missing family members. Black was struck by the public nature of the performance and wanted to bring the same energy to make Missing and Murdered Indigenous Women in Canada visible both inside and outside gallery walls.

In a 2017 interview with Toronto Life, Black also credited the book cover of Maria Campbell’s The Book of Jessica, which features a single red dress, as a subconscious influence on The REDress Project.

List of Other Artistic Works

2016-2017: Conversations with the Land/We Are the Land 
Conversations with the Land/We Are the Land is a series of photographs exploring themes of identity, memory, land, and strength. Black depicts scenes of Indigenous women and nature to express the connection between Indigenous people and the land. This collection has been featured multiple times independently and also shown in connection with The REDress project.

2017: Shards Project 
For the Shards project, Black collaborated with the University of Winnipeg in Manitoba where Black and fellow Indigenous artists KC Adams, Lita Fontaine, and Niki Little created a live performance involving Indigenous music and the use of clay to paint each other's bodies and their surroundings. Clay was used to visually demonstrate the close connection to the land Black values

2019: Works in Snow 
On the frozen surface of the Red River in Winnipeg, Canada, Black molds the shapes of bodies lying on their sides into the snow. An extension of her focus on Missing and Murdered Indigenous Women, Black reminds viewers of the violence Indigenous women experience, but also their continued presence in the memories of those who knew them. Black hopes to recreate this project at a larger scale in the future, inviting others in the community to sculpt the snow with her.

2020: Reimmersion 
In 2020, Black produced a series of photographs showing Indigenous women submerged in water. This series conveys the healing power of water to Indigenous peoples as well as the continued relevance of water to Indigenous sovereignty and security.

2020: Casting 
Casting is a single photograph depicting a white dress underwater. Black is unsure of the piece's deeper meaning but has said that a part of her artistic practice is the process of creation prior to intuiting exact meaning.

Home/Body Home/Land 
Home/Body Home/Land is a visual art installation in which Black smears clay imprints of her naked body onto the walls of art galleries. Through clay, Black connects her body to ancient generations of Métis women who have a rich cultural tradition of pottery.

Impact 
In addition to the political contributions of her work, Black's art and activism have inspired an array of subsequent works by Indigenous artists, bringing further attention to their experiences.

Starting in 2010, May 5 was recognized as Red Dress Day in Canada, where citizens are encouraged to hold grieving ceremonies, display red dresses in public spaces, and wear the color red in solidarity with the Missing and Murdered Indigenous Women (MMIW) movement.

In 2016, Mi’kmaq artist Sasha Doucette photographed red dresses and shirts at locations where dead bodies of aboriginal men and women were found in her community of Eskasoni Mi'kmaw Nation in Nova Scotia. Doucette uses social media to share her visualization of violence towards Indigenous community members.

Two high school students, Trinity Harry and Joseph Ginter spent over 300 hours in 2018 welding a red dress sculpture- crediting Jamie Black as their inspiration.

At the 2019 Vancouver Indigenous Fashion Week, a group of Indigenous designers honored Missing and Murdered Indigenous Women (MMIW) by featuring the color red in their collections.

In the U.S. House of Representatives hearing on MMIW in 2021, then New Mexico Representative Deb Haaland wore red to honor Missing and Murdered Indigenous Women.

References 

Year of birth missing (living people)
Living people
Canadian activists
Métis artists
Activists from Ontario
Artists from Ontario
University of Toronto alumni
University of Manitoba alumni
Métis feminists
21st-century Canadian women artists
Missing and Murdered Indigenous Women and Girls movement